Ayros-Arbouix is a commune in the Hautes-Pyrénées department in the Occitanie region of south-western France.

The inhabitants of the commune are known as Aybouisois or Aybouisoises.

Geography
Ayros-Arbouix is part of the Pyrénées National Park and is located some 10 km south of Lourdes just east of Argelès-Gazost. Access to the commune is by road D821 from Lourdes which changes to the D913 at the commune border and passes down the western side of the commune continuing south to join the D921 near Villelongue. The D13 comes from Boô-Silhen in the north and passes through the centre of the commune before continuing south to Préchac. The D100 links the D821 to the D13 in the commune. Access to the village is by a country road east from the D13. Apart from the village there are the hamlets of Couture Bague south-west of the village and Arbouix in the south of the commune. The commune is mixed forest and farmland.

The Gave de Pau flows along the western border of the commune as it flows north to eventually join the Gave d'Oloron forming the Gaves Réunis at Peyrehorade. The Estau river flows west through the centre of the commune to join the Gave de Pau. The Ruisseau d'Aygueberden flows west through the south of the commune to join the Gave de Pau.

Neighbouring communes and villages

Heraldry

Climate

Ayros-Arbouix has a oceanic climate (Köppen climate classification Cfb).

Administration

List of Successive Mayors

Demography
In 2017 the commune had 314 inhabitants.

Sports

The village has a green where Quilles de Neuf (Nine Bowls) is played.

See also
Communes of the Hautes-Pyrénées department

References

External links
Ayros-Arbouix on Géoportail, National Geographic Institute (IGN) website 
Airos and Arbouix on the 1750 Cassini Map

Communes of Hautes-Pyrénées